Wilder Napalm is a 1993 American dark fantasy romantic comedy film directed by Glenn Gordon Caron, written by Vince Gilligan, and starring Debra Winger, Dennis Quaid, and Arliss Howard. The screenplay concerns a pair of pyrokinetic brothers and their rivalry for the same woman.

Production
Vince Gilligan won a screenwriting competition shortly after graduating college, and producer Mark Johnson helped him find an agent and sell scripts to Hollywood. Wilder Napalm was one of the two screenplays along with Home Fries that turned into films during this time in his career.

Plot summary
Wallace (Dennis Quaid) and Wilder Foudroyant (Arliss Howard) are brothers and pyrokinetics. Ever since a childhood tragedy where they accidentally killed a homeless person sleeping in a friend's "secret clubhouse," they have kept their firestarting abilities a secret. Now that they are grown up and estranged, Wallace (performing as Biff the Clown in a traveling carnival) wants to debut his talents on The David Letterman Show. Wilder has a monotonous job in a minuscule Kwik Foto booth at a dying mall and is a volunteer firefighter.

When Wallace brings the carnival to Wilder's Florida hometown, the tension between the brothers over Wilder's oversexed wife, Vida (Debra Winger), explodes. Unable to convince Wilder to forgo his Bingo-calling on her first day of freedom after a year of house arrest for inadvertent arson, Vida goes off with Wally. They share a kiss at a miniature golf course, which bursts into the flames of their passion.

Returning home after he and the other firefighters have extinguished the flames at the golf course, Wilder discovers Vida and Wally about to make love on the roof of the house trailer. Wally and Wilder fight it out, with Wally setting the trailer ablaze. All three are jailed, but Wally and Vida are bailed out by Wally's friend and carnival partner, Rex (Jim Varney). In a deep slump, Wilder goes back to the Kwik Foto (surrounded by the carnival) while Vida stays at the firehouse. Wally goads him into fighting for Vida, and their climactic fight sets half the carnival's rides ablaze.

The denouement shows Vida and Wilder (the latter now wearing Vida's house arrest ankle monitor) watching Wallace on a successful Letterman reappearance as Dr. Napalm.

Cast
 Debra Winger as Vida Foudroyant 
 Dennis Quaid as Wallace Foudroyant 
 Arliss Howard as Wilder Foudroyant
 M. Emmet Walsh as Fire Chief
 Jim Varney as Rex 
 Charles Gideon Davis as Arnold, Singing Firemen
 John Hostetter as Matt, Singing Firemen 
 Jonathan Rubin as Bod, Singing Firemen
 Harvey Shield as Moe, Singing Firemen
 Allyce Beasley as Announcer (voice)
 Lance Lee Baxley as Young Wallace Foudroyant

Reception
According to Box Office Mojo, the domestic box office was $84,859.

On review aggregator Rotten Tomatoes, 25% of 8 reviews are positive, with an average rating of 4.9/10.

References

External links
 
 
 

1993 films
American romantic comedy films
1993 romantic comedy films
1990s English-language films
1990s fantasy comedy films
Films about firefighting
Films directed by Glenn Gordon Caron
Films with screenplays by Vince Gilligan
Films scored by Michael Kamen
TriStar Pictures films
1990s American films